Hexanitrobenzene, also known as HNB, is a high-density explosive compound with chemical formula , obtained by oxidizing the amine group of pentanitroaniline with hydrogen peroxide in sulfuric acid.

Properties 

The stable conformation of this molecule has the nitro groups rotated out of the plane of the central benzene ring. The molecule adopts a propeller-like conformation in which the nitro groups are rotated about 53° from planar.

HNB has the undesirable property of being moderately sensitive to light and, therefore, hard to utilize safely. As of 2021, it is not used in any production explosives applications, though it is used as a precursor chemical in one method of production of TATB, another explosive.

HNB was experimentally used as a gas source for explosively pumped gas dynamic laser.

Preparation 
During World War II, a method of synthesis of hexanitrobenzene was suggested in Germany, and the product was supposed to be manufactured on a semi-industrial scale according to the following scheme:
 (partial reduction)
 (nitration)
 (oxidation)
Complete nitration of benzene is practically impossible because the nitro groups are deactivating groups for further nitration.

Additional properties 
 Chapman-Jouget detonation pressure: 43 GPa
 Crystal Density: 2.01

See also 
 ONC
 Tetryl
 TNT
 RE factor

Notes

References 
 Heats of Formation and Chemical Compositions
 The synthesis and characterisation of halogen and nitro phenyl azide derivatives as highly energetic materials., PhD Thesis, Adam, D; 2001
 
 
 

Nitrobenzenes
Explosive chemicals